Lejeune, LeJeune or Le Jeune is a French surname (which in English could mean "the young" or "the younger"), and may refer to:

Claude Le Jeune (1528/1530–1600), French composer
Caroline Lejeune (disambiguation), multiple people
Édouard Le Jeune (1921–2017), French politician
Émile Lejeune (disambiguation), multiple people
Florian Lejeune (born 1991), French association footballer
Francis St David Benwell Lejeune (1899–1984) British Army officer
Geoffroy Lejeune (born 1988), French journalist
Iry LeJeune (1928–1955), American musician
Jean Lejeune (1592–1672), French priest
Jean-Denis Lejeune (born 1959), Belgian activist
Jérôme Lejeune (1926–1994), French geneticist
John A. Lejeune (1867–1942), 13th commandant of the United States Marine Corps
Kevin Lejeune (born 1985), French association footballer
Larry LeJeune (1885–1952), American baseball player
Lisanne Lejeune (born 1963), Dutch hockey player
Louis Lejeune (disambiguation), multiple people
Michel Lejeune (disambiguation), multiple people
Norman LeJeune (born 1980), American football player
Olivier Le Jeune, Canadian slave
Paul Le Jeune (1591–1664), French Jesuit missionary in Canada
Paul Lejeune-Jung (1882–1944), German economist and politician
Philippe Lejeune (born 1938), French academic
A pen name associated with Voltaire

See also

Lejeune Hall
Marine Corps Base Camp Lejeune
Lejeune High School
LeJeune Road
USS Lejeune (AP-74)

French-language surnames
Surnames from nicknames